Rugby sevens was contested at the 2019 Summer Universiade from 5 to 7 July at the Ex Nato and L. Moccia Stadium in Naples and Afragola, Italy.

Qualification
Following the FISU regulations, The maximum of 8 teams in rugby sevens events where the number of entries is larger than the authorised participation level will be selected by 
 The entry and the payment of guarantee;
 Those 4 teams finishing top rankings of the previous edition and/or FISU World University Championships will be automatically qualified;
 Those 2 teams finishing bottom rankings of the previous edition and/or FISU World University Championships will be replaced by new applying teams;
 The host is automatically qualified;
 The remaining teams will be selected by wild card system according to geographical, continental representation, FISU ranking and ISF ranking.

Qualified teams

Men's competition

Women's competition

Draw
Following the FISU regulations, draw of pool will be based on following by.
 Previous World University Championships results
 Participation in previous Summer Universiades
 Continental representation
 World Rugby Rankings

Men's competition

Women's competition

Pools composition

Medal summary

Medal table

Medal events

References

External links
Results Book – Rugby sevens

2019 Summer Universiade events
Universiade
2019
2019 Summer Universiade